In optical disc manufacturing, replication is the process of producing discs via methods that do not involve "burning" blank CD, DVD or other discs; the latter is known as duplication.

The replication of optical discs involves:
 the creation of a glass master from a client original master.
 the creation of a nickel stamper from that glass master.
 the injection molding of clear optical-grade polycarbonate substrates (clear discs) from that stamper.
 the metallizing and lacquering of those substrates to produce compact discs and DVDs.

References
 Bennett, Hugh. " The Demise of Low-Run CD Replication." EMedia Professional Aug 1999.
 How compact discs are made -- Explained by a layman for the laymen Kevin McCormick
 Disc Replication vs. Duplication Indie Music Minute by Tony van Veen, President of Disc Makers 

120 mm discs